(), The Evangelical Lutheran Cemetery of the Augsburg Confession in Warsaw is a historic Lutheran Protestant cemetery located in the Wola district, western part of Warsaw, Poland.

Details
The Evangelical Cemetery of the Augsburg Confession was consecrated on 2 May 1792, designed by the architect Szymon Bogumił Zug. More than 100,000 people have been buried at the cemetery since its opening in 1792.
During the Kościuszko Uprising of 1794 and during World War II, intense fighting took place at the cemetery. Worth seeing is the neoclassical Halpert family chapel (1835), which serves the Lutheran community. The chapel was rebuilt in 1975, however, many tombstones are still destroyed or in poor condition. As in the Roman Catholic Powązki Cemetery, a committee for the restoration of the cemetery has been set up, and collects money on All Saint's Day for the treasures of the burial ground to be returned to their former glory.

Selected notable burials
A few of the notable people buried here:
 Juliusz Bursche (1862–1942), bishop of the Evangelical-Augsburg Church in Poland. A vocal opponent of Nazi Germany, after the German invasion of Poland in 1939 he was arrested by the Germans, tortured, and sent to Sachsenhausen concentration camp where he died
 Wojciech Gerson (1831–1901), Polish painter and professor
 Samuel Linde (1771–1847), Polish linguist, librarian, and lexicographer of the Polish language
 Johann Christian Schuch (1752–1813), Dresden-born garden designer and architect, active in Poland
 Szymon Bogumił Zug (1733–1807), Polish-German classicist architect and designer of gardens
 Karol Ernest Wedel (1813–1902), Polish-German entrepreneur and founder of Poland's most famous chocolate brand E. Wedel
 Wiesław Wernic (1906−1986), popular Polish writer and journalist, best known for his series of Wild West books, sometimes called "Polish Karl May"
 Edward Kłosiński (1943−2008), Polish cinematographer
 Michalina Wisłocka (1921−2005), Polish gynecologist, sexologist, and author of Sztuka kochania (The Art of Loving, 1976)
 Gabriela Kownacka (1952−2010), Polish film and theater actress
 Adam Pilch, military chaplain

Gallery

External links 

 Satellitephoto
 
 Flickr-Photo

Cemeteries in Warsaw
Lutheran cemeteries
Wola